London Trans+ Pride is a pride march advocating transgender rights held in London, England.

History 
Trans Pride London was founded in 2019 by Lucia Blayke and Finn Love. It was founded in part due to a rising climate of transphobia in the UK and across the world, as well as in response to an anti-transgender protest controversy that occurred at the Pride in London march in 2018, where eight anti-trans activists took the lead of the march without authorisation. The 2019 march was held in September and saw attendance of around 1500 people.

The 2020 march saw attendance of 4000 people, with a number of COVID-19 safety measures put in place by the organisers, and called for legal recognition of non-binary identities and a ban on intersex genital mutilation. It also included a memorial to Elie Che, a prominent transgender London activist and performer who died in August of that year.

The 2021 march was held in June, and included calls for a ban on conversion therapy, greater access to healthcare for trans people, and a ban on intersex genital mutilation. The event included speeches by Munroe Bergdorf, Ki Griffin, Bimini Bon-Boulash, Abigail Thorn, and Kai-Isaiah Jamal.

The 2022 march was held in July, with attendance of over 20,000 people. The event called to "celebrate the memory of trans lives taken and uphold the next generation of trans revolutionaries," and included speeches by Yasmin Finney and Charlie Craggs. Abigail Thorn said at the event that "legally and politically", trans people in the country "are not allowed to control our own lives".

References 

Pride parades in England
Transgender events
Transgender organisations in the United Kingdom